The rue La Boétie is a street in the 8th arrondissement of Paris, running from rue d'Astorg to avenue des Champs-Élysées. It is named in honour of Étienne de La Boétie (1530–1563), friend of moralist Michel de Montaigne.

History
From 1640, the space today found between the streets of the Colosseum and Berri, avenue des Champs-Élysées and the rue du Faubourg-Saint-Honoré was occupied by the Royal nursery. This provided all the trees, shrubs and flowers for the Royal residences. Decommissioned under the Régence to make way for a subdivision planned by John Law, the plan was eventually dropped.

In 1755 the land became the property of the Louis Phélypeaux, comte de Saint-Florentin, who was then Secretary of State of the Maison du Roi, who ceded it in 1764 to his mistress, Marie-Madeleine de Cusacque the Countess of Langeac (1725–1778). She then sold it in 1772 to the Comte d'Artois, who later became Charles X of France, Louis XVI's younger brother.

New letters patent of 4 April 1778 approved the opening of the streets of Ponthieu, Neuve-de-Berri (current rue de Berri), new-de-Poitiers (current rue d'Artois) and Angoulême-Saint-Honoré.

During the French Revolution and until 1815, the street bore the name  rue de l'Union (Union Street). It then resumed its original name until 1830, when it became rue de la Charte (Street of the Charter). It then underwent a quick succession of names, becoming rue Lapeyrouse, rue d'Angoulême once again (1852), rue de Morny (1863), rue de la Commune (1871), rue Mac-Mahon and finally rue Pierre-Charron in 1871. The area between the place Saint-Augustin and the place Chand-Goyon was called rue de la Pépinière until 1868, and then rue Abattucci.

The street took its current name in 1879, throughout its length, in honour of Étienne de La Boétie (1530–1563), friend moralist of Michel de Montaigne.

Notable buildings

References

Boetie